Les Ailes de la Mode Inc. was a Quebec department store chain. Its flagship store was in downtown Montreal and was the anchor tenant of the Complexe Les Ailes. Les Ailes de la Mode also subleased a section of their department stores to Bowring Brothers.

Les Ailes de la Mode was last based in Toronto, Ontario alongside parent company Fairweather I.N.C Group. Prior to 2005, it was based in Boucherville, Quebec as part of the San Francisco Group.

History

Founding and early growth
Les Ailes de la Mode was founded in 1993 by Paul Delage Roberge as a division of its San Francisco women clothing chain. The name "Les Ailes de la Mode" was derived from a magazine of the same name that was founded in 1988 by Jean Delage Roberge.

Les Ailes de la Mode opened its first store in 1994 at Mail Champlain in Brossard, Quebec. At the time, the two-story location featured a pianist who would play throughout the store, a restaurant, a coffee shop named Brulerie-les-Ailes, and a talking bear in the children's section. The popularity of Les Ailes de la Mode inspired an IMAX theatre which was opening at the same mall in 1996 to call itself Imax Les Ailes.

Les Ailes de la Mode established an image as an upscale department store selling prestigious apparel and cosmetic brands, including Hugo Boss, Versace, G-Star, Dolce & Gabbana, Tommy Hilfiger, Armani, Nautica, Polo Ralph Lauren, DKNY, Diesel, Jones New York, Calvin Klein, Guess, Lancôme, and Chanel.

In 1996, Les Ailes de la Mode opened a  store at Carrefour Laval, in a space which occupied a Pascal hardware store five years before.

The third Les Ailes de la Mode store opened in 1997 at Place Sainte-Foy in Sainte-Foy, Quebec. As with the Brossard store, it had a 'Brulerie-les-Ailes as well as a Côté Jardin restaurant in the mezzanine. In this particular store, there was a small play area for kids.

In 2001, Les Ailes de la Mode opened its fourth store in Bayshore Shopping Centre in Nepean, Ontario.

The long-awaited downtown Montreal flagship store of Les Ailes de la Mode opened on August 7, 2002 in the former space of Eaton's department store which had been converted into a new shopping mall called Complexe Les Ailes and named after Les Ailes de la Mode. Upon its opening, the 223,000-square-foot, four-floor flagship store included a karaoke (where Musique Plus would broadcast its television program Karaoclip ), an art gallery, a wedding registry service, a shoe waxing service, a vodka bar, many breast-feeding rooms, a carousel and amusements in the children's section as well as many other attractions. The store also featured four restaurants: 1) Kouros Bar, a bar selling exclusively vodka 2) Kouros Tea Room, a tea bar 3) Stto Shushi Bar and 4) Kouros Restaurant, which offered tapas and Mediterranean snacks. The downtown store employed 1,000 people.

Throughout the 1990s and early 2000s, Les Ailes de la Mode was at its peak. In 1998, its stock was worth $54 per share. The company had its own foundation, la fondation Les Ailes, which raised funds for the health and education sectors. It participated in charity events and would annually draw a high-priced house called La maison de rêve Les Ailes. The foundation raised $1,600,000 in 2002 for many established organizations. Shoe waxing, wedding registering and many other services were offered in Les Ailes de la Mode stores. During December each year, the stores designate a portion of their floorspace as a Christmas section where children would get to meet Santa Claus in his kingdom.

Decline
Les Ailes de la Mode's problems began in 2003 as a direct result of the openings of the Bayshore and Montreal stores. The company's quick expansion was more than  it could afford. The downtown Montreal store was particularly too large for what the market could handle, and it saddled the company with debt that would force it into bankruptcy.

The Bayshore store was closed down in 2003, less than two years after its opening.  In January 2004, the size of the downtown Montreal store was reduced to 76,764 square feet across two floors: roughly a third of its former size. Despite these drastic measures, however, Les Ailes de la Mode never recovered from the troubles initiated by these two stores.

Meanwhile, these troubles began to be reflected across the chain. La fondation Les Ailes and its programs were terminated. Plans to open new stores in Fairview Pointe-Claire, Marché Central and Lac-Mirabel and expand in Toronto, Vancouver and the United States were scrapped.

Les Ailes de la Mode's underperformance drove the entire San Francisco Group into bankruptcy in December 2003. After exiting bankruptcy in July 2004, the San Francisco Group was renamed Groupe Les Ailes de la Mode, with Les Ailes de la Mode being one of its just two remaining divisions (the other being Bikini Village).

Change of direction
In August 2005, Groupe Les Ailes de la Mode sold Les Ailes de la Mode to Fairweather Group (currently named Fairweather I.N.C Group),  who heavily modified the concept of Les Ailes de la Mode from an upscale department store to a discount store.Les Ailes de la Mode magazine ceased publication and was discontinued. Les Ailes de la Mode stopped selling prestigious apparel and cosmetic brands, including Hugo Boss, Versace, G-Star, Dolce & Gabbana, Tommy Hilfiger, Armani, Nautica, Polo Ralph Lauren, DKNY, Diesel, Jones New York, Calvin Klein, Guess, Lancôme, and Chanel.  Instead, Les Ailes de la Mode sold discount merchandise from the various store banners and in-house brands of parent company Fairweather I.N.C Group, including International Concepts, Stockhomme, Pinstripe, Fairweather, and Randy River. These brands, largely unknown to Quebec consumers due to the absence of several of these store banners in the province, rendered Les Ailes de la Mode stores as outlets for all merchandise of Fairweather I.N.C Group.

In-store restaurants and beauty salons were all shut down, and the stores no longer sold cosmetics and pianos. Most checkout and fitting rooms were closed, leaving several of Les Ailes de la Mode' shuttered sections unoccupied. The size of the downtown Montreal store reduced so drastically that it began using the mall corridor, Complexe Les Ailes, to display and sell merchandise. Les Ailes de la Mode' return policy became restricted to exchanges only for items on regular price, with no returns at all for items on sales.

Final years and closure

The management of Carrefour Laval, unsatisfied with Les Ailes de la Mode's new identity and lack of cachet, decided not to renew the store lease upon expiry in February 2011. The management of Complexe Les Ailes had also questioned the future of the store in their mall for similar reasons.

The closure of the Place Ste-Foy store was announced in March 2014 and completed on February 25, 2015.

The Ailes de la Mode at Complexe Les Ailes closed in early 2016,  with most of the remaining locations (Drummondville and Chateauguay) unceremoniously closing throughout the year.

The last store in Brossard followed suit in 2017, effectively ending the 24-year-old retailer.

Warehouses
In addition to the aforementioned department stores, Les Ailes de la Mode had warehouses located at Le Faubourg de l'Île in Pincourt, Les Galeries de la Canardière in Quebec City, Place Fleurs de Lys in Quebec City, Centre Les Rivières in Trois-Rivières and Place du Royaume in Chicoutimi.

Les Ailes de La Mode Xpress

The Les Ailes de La Mode Xpress chain was a smaller version of Les Ailes de la Mode. It consisted of 8 boutiques.

Les Ailes de La Mode Xpress was a unisex retailer and all of its goods were also sold in large Les Ailes de la Mode stores. Les Ailes  de La Mode Xpress shared the same logo as Les Ailes de la Mode department stores with the addition of the term "Xpress" underneath. The shopping bags at the Xpress stores were the same as the department store.

Fairweather I.N.C Group launched the "Les Ailes de La Mode Xpress" sub-banner  by renaming its GLAM'' chain. GLAM was an acronym for Groupe Les Ailes de la Mode, the former parent company name of Les Ailes de la Mode, despite being operated by Fairweather. Prior to the rebranding of GLAM to Les Ailes Xpress, the chain was also named I&F'''. In 2012, the Xpress stores were rebranded under the "La Compagnie INC Fairweather" brand.

Locations

Department stores (closed)

Brossard - Mail Champlain 
Laval - Carrefour Laval
Montreal - Complexe Les Ailes
Ottawa, Ontario - Bayshore Shopping Centre
Quebec City - Place Sainte-Foy
Châteauguay - Centre Régional
Drummondville - Promenades Drummondville

Warehouses (closed)

Chicoutimi, Place du Royaume
Trois-Rivières, Centre Les Rivières
Quebec City - Fleur de Lys centre commercial
Pincourt - Le Faubourg de l'Île
Quebec City - Les Galeries de la Canardière

Les Ailes de la Mode Xpress stores (rebranded as "La Compagnie INC Fairweather")

Brossard - Quartier DIX30
Joliette - Galeries Joliette
Montreal - Carrefour Angrignon, Place Versailles, Place Vertu
Pointe-Claire - Fairview Pointe-Claire
Quebec City - Promenades Beauport
Trois-Rivières - Carrefour Trois-Rivières Ouest
Sherbrooke - Carrefour de l'Estrie (Now Closed)

References

External links
 Official website

Companies based in North York
Defunct department stores
Defunct retail companies of Canada
Clothing companies established in 1993
Retail companies established in 1993
Retail companies disestablished in 2017
Clothing retailers of Canada